The fourth season of the American television drama series Sons of Anarchy premiered on September 6, 2011, and concluded on December 6, 2011, after 14 episodes aired on cable network FX. Created by Kurt Sutter, it is about the lives of a close-knit outlaw motorcycle club operating in Charming, a fictional town in California's Central Valley. The show centers on protagonist Jackson "Jax" Teller (Charlie Hunnam), the then–vice president of the club, and is first shown as the new president here, who begins questioning the club and himself. 

It is the longest season of Sons of Anarchy and the only season to have 14 episodes, as every other season had 13 episodes.

The season premiere ("Out") was written by series creator and executive producer Kurt Sutter and was one of the highest-rated telecasts in FX's history.

Sons of Anarchy is the story of the Teller-Morrow family of Charming, California, as well as other members of the Sons of Anarchy Motorcycle Club, Redwood Original (SAMCRO), their families, various Charming townspeople, allied and rival gangs, associates, and law agencies that undermine or support SAMCRO's legal and illegal enterprises.

Plot
After the deaths of Agent Stahl and Jimmy O’Phelan, the imprisoned SAMCRO members leave the penitentiary after their 14-month stay and are met by Lieutenant Eli Roosevelt of the San Joaquin Sheriff's Department, the new law enforcement presence in Charming. They also discover Hale has become the mayor. US Attorney Lincoln Potter seeks Lieutenant Roosevelt's help to build a RICO case against SAMCRO.

Cast and characters

 

 
 
Sons of Anarchy is the story of the Teller-Morrow family of Charming, California, as well as the other members of Sons of Anarchy Motorcycle Club, Redwood Original (SAMCRO), their families, various Charming townspeople, allied and rival gangs, associates, and law agencies that undermine or support SAMCRO's legal and illegal enterprises.

Main cast
 Charlie Hunnam as Jackson "Jax" Teller 
 Katey Sagal as Gemma Teller Morrow 
 Mark Boone Junior as Robert "Bobby Elvis" Munson
 Dayton Callie as Wayne Unser
 Kim Coates as Alex "Tig" Trager 
 Tommy Flanagan as Filip "Chibs" Telford
 Ryan Hurst as Harry "Opie" Winston 
 William Lucking as Piermont "Piney" Winston 
 Theo Rossi as Juan-Carlos "Juice" Ortiz 
 Maggie Siff as Tara Knowles-Teller 
 Ron Perlman as Clarence "Clay" Morrow

Special guest cast
 Rockmond Dunbar as Lieutenant Eli Roosevelt 
 Ray McKinnon as Assistant U.S. Attorney Lincoln Potter 
 Danny Trejo as Romero "Romeo" Parada 
 Kenny Johnson as Herman Kozik 
 Drea de Matteo as Wendy Case 
 Marianne Jean-Baptiste as Vivica 
 David Hasselhoff as Dondo
 Sonny Barger as Lenny "The Pimp" Janowitz

Recurring cast 
 Christopher Douglas Reed as Philip "Filthy Phil" Russell 
 Emilio Rivera as Marcus Alvarez 
 David LaBrava as Happy Lowman
 Benito Martinez as Luis Torres 
 David Rees Snell as Agent Grad Nicholas 
 Michael Marisi Ornstein as Chuck Marstein 
 Winter Ave Zoli as Lyla Winston 
 McNally Sagal as Margaret Murphy 
 Frank Potter as Eric Miles 
 Jeff Kober as Jacob Hale Jr. 
 Niko Nicotera as George "Rat Boy" Skogstorm 
 Kurt Sutter as "Big" Otto Delaney
 Timothy V. Murphy as Galen O'Shay
 Merle Dandridge as Rita Roosevelt 
 Kristen Renton as Ima 
 Patrick St. Esprit as Elliott Oswald 
 Bob McCracken as Brendan Roarke 
 Walter Wong as Chris "V-Lin" Von Lin 
 Tory Kittles as Laroy Wayne

Guest stars
 Tom Arnold as Georgie Caruso 
 Randolph Mantooth as Charlie Horse 
 Keith Szarabajka as Victor Putlova 
 Rachel Miner as Dawn Trager 
 Olivia Burnette as Homeless Woman 
 Brian Goodman as Huff (Vice President of SAMTAZ)
 Paul John Vasquez as Angel Ganz

Production
Although Sons of Anarchy is set in Northern California's Central Valley, it is filmed primarily at Occidental Studios Stage 5A in North Hollywood. Main sets located there include the clubhouse, St. Thomas Hospital and Jax's house. The production rooms at the studio used by the writing staff also double as the Charming police station. External scenes are often filmed nearby in Sun Valley and Tujunga.

Reception
Alan Sepinwall stated that the fourth season risked predictability by returning to a successful formula of storytelling, but he nonetheless preferred those episodes to those of season three. Maureen Ryan reviewed the fourth season positively. She praised the addition of Lincoln Potter (played by Ray McKinnon), comparing the character's quality to that of antagonist Gustavo Fring from Breaking Bad. On review aggregator website Rotten Tomatoes, the season has a rare approval rating of 100% based on 24 reviews. The site's critical consensus reads: "Sons of Anarchy'''s fourth season is a smart return to the show's original themes, integrated with buzzworthy new elements." The A.V. Club called the fourth season more "focused" and "operatic". AV Club reviewer Zack Handlen was fond of the season but felt disappointed with the finale, saying it featured a "lousy case of dictated convenience, of an arbitrary and unbelievable reveal used to shift characters around to where the writers want them to be for next season, as opposed to where they might land organically." However, the review did praise Charlie Hunnam's performance in the finale. TIME said the fourth season was the strongest since season two, but the show needed to end sooner rather than later. TIME'' also agreed that the finale's contrivances were sometimes too visible, stating "it’s the principle: you can only turn up alive at your own funeral so many times before it starts to lose its impact."

Episodes

Home media release
The fourth season was released in the United States on DVD and Blu-ray on August 28, 2012.

References

External links
 Sons of Anarchy at FXNetworks.com
 

 
2011 American television seasons